Unspoiled Monsters is the seventh album by the Danish alternative rock act Sort Sol and the fifth after the renaming of the band from the earlier Sods. It is the first without the original member Peter Peter, as he left the band before pre-production of the album. The album is a departure from Sort Sol's earlier albums, being less aggressive and much more experimental, incorporating programmed beats and greater number of keyboards. The songs are less melodic and more based on atmosphere.

A 'first-run' limited edition of 'Unspoiled Monsters' was released and it was the first ever music CD released in Europe, containing an interactive multimedia presentation.
The limited edition presentation contained a series of videos - one from a photo shoot in Poland and one personal presentation of each member, shot by the members themselves.

Track listing
Untitled - 5:05 (Jørgensen/Top-Galia)
Sharks Capital - 5:02 (Jørgensen/Top-Galia)
My Stars - 4:46 (Jørgensen/Top-Galia)
Anything That Moves - 4:09 (Odde)
Kiss The Streets - 4:41 (Jørgensen/Top-Galia)
Sol 66 - 4:17 (Odde)
The Painter - 4:35 (Odde/Odde, Top-Galia)
Tall Ships - 5:56 (Jørgensen/Top-Galia)
Mystery Summer - 4:50 (Odde)
Erlkönig - 6:37 (Jørgensen/Top-Galia)

Personnel
Sort Sol
 Lars Top-Galia – guitar
 Knud Odde – bass guitar
 Steen Jørgensen – vocals
 Tomas Ortved – drums

Additional musicians and production
 Wili Jønsson – additional bass guitar, backing vocals and mellotron
 Natalia Feinberg – on "Untitled" and "Sharks Capital"
 Henrik Liebgott – on "My Stars"
 Louisiana Museum Art Ensemble – strings on "Sol 66" and "My Stars"
 Rosie Lindsell – arranging and conducting on "Sol 66" and "My Stars"
 Ian Caple – production, mixing and engineering
 Tim Young – mastering
 Flemming "Doom" Rasmussen – assisting engineering
 Martin Hansen Andersen – Design and production of limited edition presentation

1996 albums
Sort Sol albums
Columbia Records albums